The Hanford Village George Washington Carver Addition Historic District is a historic district in the Hanford Village neighborhood of Columbus, Ohio. It was listed on the National Register of Historic Places in 2013. At the time of nomination, the site consisted of 95 buildings, sites, or structures, 76 of which are contributing. Most are one-and-a-half-story gabled Cape Cod houses with simplified Colonial Revival features.

The George Washington Carver Addition is significant as part of a historic suburban municipality built for African American World War II veterans. The district illustrates the struggles and limits that Black citizens had in a segregated society. The district is also notable as the home of many of the Tuskegee Airmen while they operated out of the nearby Lockbourne Army Airport.

See also
 National Register of Historic Places listings in Columbus, Ohio

References

National Register of Historic Places in Columbus, Ohio
Historic districts on the National Register of Historic Places in Ohio
2013 establishments in Ohio
Historic districts in Columbus, Ohio
Near East Side (Columbus, Ohio)